Maumee is an unincorporated community in Salt Creek Township, Jackson County, Indiana.

History
A post office was established at Maumee in 1880, and remained in operation until it was discontinued in 1928. Maumee is derived from Miami, a name honoring the Miami people.

Geography

References

Unincorporated communities in Jackson County, Indiana
Unincorporated communities in Indiana